Isotoma petraea,  commonly known as rock isotome, is a small, herbaceous plant in the family Campanulaceae occurring in arid regions of Australia. It has single, purplish-blue flowers on smooth, slender branches from February to November.

Description
Flowering occurs mostly in summer.

Taxonomy and naming
This species was first formally described in 1853 by Ferdinand von Mueller and the description was published in Linnaea: ein Journal für die Botanik in ihrem ganzen Umfange, oder Beiträge zur Pflanzenkunde. The specific epithet (petraea) is derived from the Latin petraeus meaning "growing amongst rocks".

Distribution and habitat
It is found on breakways, among rocky outcrops and in rock crevices in the Mid West, Wheatbelt and Goldfields-Esperance regions of Western Australia where it grows in shallow sandy soils over granite.In New South Wales it grows west of Wilcannia mostly on slopes and rocky locations on shallow granite based soils. In South Australia it is a widespread species growing in rocky locations.

References

petraea
Flora of Australia
Plants described in 1853
Taxa named by Ferdinand von Mueller